Justice Vincent M. Fernando was a Sri Lankan judge. He was a Judge of the Supreme Court of Ceylon.

He served as a crown counsel taking part in several notable cases such as the Basnayaka Nilame Vs Attorney General. He was appointed to the Supreme Court on 11 November 1937. His son, H. N. G. Fernando became the 33rd Chief Justice of Ceylon. His home, Jefferson House is now the residence Ambassador of the United States in Colombo.

References

Puisne Justices of the Supreme Court of Sri Lanka
Sinhalese judges
Alumni of Royal College, Colombo